This is a list of current and former Roman Catholic churches in the Roman Catholic Archdiocese of Boston. The archdiocese includes more than 300 churches. The cathedral church of the diocese is the Cathedral of Holy Cross. The archdiocese is divided into five regions as follows:
 Central Region: covering the city of Boston
 Merrimack Region: covering portions of Essex and Middlesex Counties (including Lowell) in the northernmost section of the archdiocese
 North Region: covering portions of Essex, Middlesex, and Suffolk Counties (including Lynn, Salem, and Woburn) located directly to the north and east of Boston
 South Region: covering portions of Norfolk and Plymouth Counties (including Plymouth, Quincy, and Weymouth) located in the southernmost section of the archdiocese
 West Region: covering portions of Middlesex and Norfolk Counties (including Framingham, Newton, and Waltham) located in the western sections of the archdiocese

Central Region

Merrimack Region

North Region

South Region

West Region

References

 
Boston